This was a new event added to the ITF Women's Circuit in 2016. 

Christina McHale won the title, defeating Raveena Kingsley in an all-American final, 6–3, 4–6, 6–4.

Seeds

Main draw

Finals

Top half

Bottom half

References 
 Main draw

Tennis Championships of Maui - Singles